The Edgar Martínez Outstanding Designated Hitter Award, commonly referred to as the Edgar Martínez Award and originally known as the Outstanding Designated Hitter Award, has been presented annually to the most outstanding designated hitter (DH) in the American League (AL) in Major League Baseball (MLB) since 1973. The award is voted on by club beat reporters, broadcasters and AL public relations departments. All players with a minimum of 100 at bats at DH are eligible. It was given annually by members of the Associated Press who are beat writers, broadcasters, and public relations directors. The Associated Press discontinued the award in 2000, but it was picked up by the Baseball Writers' Association of America, which has administered it since. 

In September 2004, at Safeco Field ceremonies in honor of Edgar Martínez, Commissioner Bud Selig announced that the award would be renamed for the five-time recipient (1995, 1997–98, 2000–01). In an 18-year career with the Seattle Mariners, primarily as a designated hitter, Martínez batted .312, with 309 career home runs and 1,261 runs batted in.

In 2020, Major League Baseball allowed the use of the designated hitter for the National League (NL) in addition to the American League, expanding eligibility for the award to designated hitters in either league. The 2020 winner was Marcell Ozuna of the Atlanta Braves, who became the first-ever winner of the award from the National League. In 2021, MLB returned to only using the designated hitter for the American League, before a new collective bargaining agreement between MLB and its players' union allowed the use of the Designated Hitter in the National League beginning in the 2022 season.

David Ortiz has won the award eight times, more than any other player (2003–2007, 2011, 2013, 2016). Other repeat winners of the award include Martinez himself (five times), three-time winner Hal McRae (1976, 1980, and 1982) and two-time winners Willie Horton (1975 and 1979), Greg Luzinski (1981 and 1983), Don Baylor (1985 and 1986), Harold Baines (1987 and 1988), Dave Parker (1989 and 1990), Paul Molitor (1993 and 1996), and Nelson Cruz (2017 and 2019). Boston Red Sox players have won the most Edgar Martínez Awards with eleven.

In 2021, Shohei Ohtani became the first player to win both the Edgar Martinez Award and the American League MVP award in the same season.

Key

List of winners

See also

List of Silver Slugger Award winners at designated hitter
List of Major League Baseball awards

References
In-line citations

Awards established in 1973
Batting (baseball)
Major League Baseball trophies and awards